Ollanta Humala began his presidency when he was sworn into the office of President of the Republic of Peru on 28 July 2011. On the same day, he represented his cabinet, headed by the non-partisan Salomón Lerner Ghitis. On 10 December 2011, Lerner stepped down, following fierce protests against a mining project. He was replaced by Interior Minister Oscar Valdés. The next day, Valdés presented a new cabinet, having replaced eleven ministers.

Humala's Second Vice President Omar Chehade was temporarily suspended by Congress on 5 December 2011, facing corruption allegations. On 16 January 2012, Chehade resigned permanently.

First Cabinet

Second Cabinet

References

Humala, Ollanta